Gordon Samuel MacMurchy (1926-2005) was a Canadian politician, who represented the electoral district of Last Mountain from 1971 to 1975, and Last Mountain-Touchwood from 1975 to 1982, in the Legislative Assembly of Saskatchewan. He was a member of the Saskatchewan New Democratic Party. He served as a cabinet minister in the government of Allan Blakeney.

The son of Edward Gordon MacMurchy and Laura Geiger, he took over the operation of the family farm in 1962. From 1962 to 1971, he served as a trustee for the Govan school unit, also serving two years as chairman. MacMurchy served as Minister of Education, Minister of Municipal Affairs and Minister of Agriculture in the Saskatchewan cabinet. He was defeated when he ran for reelection to the assembly in 1982. After leaving provincial politics, MacMurchy was mayor of Semans from 1982 to 1997. He ran unsuccessfully in the provincial riding of Last Mountain-Touchwood in 1986.

In 1949, he married Jean Neff.

Also active in sport, his tenure with the Semans Wheat Kings earned five provincial intermediate C championships, and six Last Mountain Hockey League championships. MacMurchy received the Canadian Amateur Hockey Association Trophy for service to minor hockey in 1969. He served as an umpire, and was inducted into the Saskatchewan Baseball Hall of Fame in 1989. In October 1999, he received the Saskatchewan Order of Merit.

MacMurchy died in Nokomis, Saskatchewan at the age of 78.

References

1926 births
2005 deaths
Mayors of places in Saskatchewan
Members of the Executive Council of Saskatchewan
Members of the Saskatchewan Order of Merit
Saskatchewan New Democratic Party MLAs
Sportspeople from Saskatchewan